The Alves Historic District, in Henderson, Kentucky, is a  historic district which was listed on the National Register of Historic Places in 1989.

The district is roughly bounded by Green, Center, S. Alvasia, Powell, S. Adams and Washington Streets, and included 94 contributing buildings and two contributing structures.

It includes the J. Hawkins Hart House, which is separately listed on the National Register.

It includes Bungalow/craftsman and Late Victorian architecture.

References

National Register of Historic Places in Henderson County, Kentucky
Historic districts on the National Register of Historic Places in Kentucky
Victorian architecture in Kentucky
Henderson, Kentucky